The 2019 WGC-Mexico Championship was a golf tournament played February 21–24 at Club de Golf Chapultepec in Naucalpan, Mexico, just west of Mexico City. It was the 20th time the WGC Championship was played, and the first of the World Golf Championships events to be staged in 2019. The approximate elevation of the course's clubhouse is  

Dustin Johnson eased to a 5 stroke victory ahead of Rory McIlroy to win his third WGC Championship (second in Mexico), and sixth World Golf Championship overall. Although the victory did not immediately return Johnson to world number one, he and the current number one (Justin Rose) were not competing in the following week, which meant he was guaranteed to return to top spot a week later.

Course layout
Club de Golf Chapultepec

Source:

Field
The field consisted of players from the top of the Official World Golf Ranking and the money lists/Orders of Merit from the six main professional golf tours. Each player is classified according to the first category in which he qualified, but other categories are shown in parentheses.

1. The top 50 players from the Official World Golf Ranking, as of February 11, 2019
Kiradech Aphibarnrat (2,5), Lucas Bjerregaard (5), Keegan Bradley (2,3), Rafa Cabrera-Bello (2), Patrick Cantlay (2,3), Paul Casey (2,3), Bryson DeChambeau (2,3,4,6), Tony Finau (2,3), Matt Fitzpatrick (2), Tommy Fleetwood (2,3,5), Rickie Fowler (2,3), Sergio García (2,5), Branden Grace (2), Emiliano Grillo, Tyrrell Hatton (2,5), Billy Horschel (2,3), Dustin Johnson (2,3), Kevin Kisner (2), Brooks Koepka (2,3), Matt Kuchar (2,4), Marc Leishman (2,3,4), Li Haotong (2,5,6), Shane Lowry (2,6), Hideki Matsuyama (2,3), Rory McIlroy (2,3,5), Phil Mickelson (2,3,4), Francesco Molinari (2,3,5), Alex Norén (2,5), Thorbjørn Olesen (2,5), Louis Oosthuizen (2,6), Eddie Pepperell (2,5), Ian Poulter (2,6), Jon Rahm (2,3,5), Chez Reavie (2), Patrick Reed (2,3,5), Xander Schauffele (2,3,4,5), Webb Simpson (2,3), Cameron Smith (2,3), Jordan Spieth (2), Kyle Stanley (2,3), Henrik Stenson (2), Justin Thomas (2,3,4), Matt Wallace (2,5,6), Bubba Watson (2,3), Gary Woodland (2,3,4), Tiger Woods (2,3)
Jason Day (2,3), Andrew Putnam (2), Justin Rose (2,3,4,5), and Adam Scott (2) did not play.

2. The top 50 players from the Official World Golf Ranking, as of February 18, 2019
Charles Howell III (4)
J. B. Holmes (4) did not play.

3. The top 30 players from the final 2018 FedExCup Points List
Patton Kizzire, Kevin Na, Aaron Wise

4. The top 10 players from the 2019 FedExCup Points List, as of February 18, 2019

5. The top 20 players from the final 2018 European Tour Race to Dubai
Alexander Björk, Russell Knox, Lee Westwood, Danny Willett

6. The top 10 players from the 2019 European Tour Race to Dubai, as of February 11, 2019
David Lipsky, Joost Luiten, Aaron Rai, Richard Sterne

7. The top 2 players not exempt from the final 2018 Japan Golf Tour Order of Merit
Shugo Imahira, Shaun Norris

8. The top 2 players from the final 2018 PGA Tour of Australasia Order of Merit
Jake McLeod, Matthew Millar

9. The leading two available players from the final 2017–18 Sunshine Tour Order of Merit
George Coetzee, Erik van Rooyen

10. The top 2 players from the final 2018 Asian Tour Order of Merit
Park Sang-hyun, Shubhankar Sharma

11. The highest-ranked available player from Mexico from the Official World Golf Ranking as of February 11, 2019
Abraham Ancer

12. Alternates to fill field to 72 (if necessary) from the Official World Golf Ranking as of February 18, 2019
An Byeong-hun (56)
Tom Lewis (57)
Satoshi Kodaira (58)
Adrián Otaegui (64)
Ryan Fox (66)
Kim Si-woo (52), Brandt Snedeker (54) and Adam Hadwin (62) did not play.

Round summaries

First round
Thursday, February 21, 2019

Rory McIlroy shot an 8-under-par 63 to take a one-shot lead over Dustin Johnson.

Second round
Friday, February 22, 2019

Third round
Saturday, February 23, 2019

Final round
Sunday, February 24, 2019

Scorecard
Final round

Cumulative tournament scores, relative to par

Source:

References

External links

Coverage on the European Tour's official site

WGC Championship
Golf tournaments in Mexico
Sport in the State of Mexico
Naucalpan de Juárez
WGC-Mexico Championship
WGC-Mexico Championship
WGC-Mexico Championship